Sudler is a surname. Notable people with the surname include:

 Monnette Sudler (1952–2022), American jazz guitarist
 Whitney Sudler-Smith (born 1968), American filmmaker, television director, and guitarist

See also
 Sudler House